The E-mu Proteus was a range of digital sound modules and keyboards manufactured by E-mu Systems in the late twentieth century.

History
E-mu Systems came to prominence in the early 1980s with their relatively affordable Emulator sampler, and subsequently pioneered sample-based synthesis technology with the Proteus range. Unlike earlier types of synthesisers, sample-based equipment does not derive its raw sounds from electronic oscillators or algorithmically generated waveforms, but from recorded sounds held in read-only memory (ROM) chips. These sounds may then be layered, filtered, modulated by low frequency oscillation and shaped by ADSR envelopes. However, unlike a true sampler, such devices do not allow the user to record sounds but instead offer a range of factory sounds suitable for any given use. This type of sound production dominated electronic music production for several years in the late 20th century. The exclusive license for re-formatting and managing historical E-MU Proteus sound content has been acquired by Digital Sound Factory.

Models

The Proteus range was developed into several models, some differing from each other only by the sound banks they contained, which were optimised for different purposes. However, since most allowed four ROM chips to be mounted, and these chips were available separately, real differences might be simply cosmetic. The available ROM chips included the Composer, a work-horse set of sounds useful for popular music production, three orchestral ROMs, the Vintage Keys collection of electric organs, pianos and classic synthesisers, a chip dedicated to the Hammond organ and a drum ROM as well as the Orbit and Mo-Phatt collections, aimed at dance and urban genres and the Xtreme Lead, optimised for monophonic synthesiser soloing. The original Proteus trilogy contains 192 patches each (Proteus 1, Proteus 2 and Proteus 3). However, they could be also upgraded by obtaining XR versions, having extra read-only memory (ROM) for more sound patches, that would have 384 each.

Though the Proteus was mainly known as a keyboardless MIDI sound module, E-mu also marketed the Proteus MPS (Master Performance System), a 61-key keyboard version of the Proteus module.

Proteus 2000

The Proteus 2000 released in 1999 was a 1U rack sound module based on Audity 2000 released in 1998. It contained many "bread and butter" sounds, among just over a thousand waves utilising 32 megabytes of ROM. It featured up to 128 voice polyphony and 32-part multi-timbrality. It could be expanded with slots for three additional sound ROM cards.  A cheaper Proteus 1000 model was also introduced with the same soundest and ROM but only 64 voice polyphony and fewer individual sound outputs. The Proteus 2000 also has Protozoa ROM expansions that contain patches from the original Proteus trilogy, where the first 128 patches towards each of the three modules respectively were faithfully re-mastered digitally from scratch that could be purchased to add onto the module, consisting a total of 384 patches of up to 16 MB of memory.

Proteus 2500
This 4U rack model was designed to function as a rack-mounted, front-panel-programmable sound source. It was equipped with sixteen multi-function pads and the same number of programmable knobs and had an onboard sequencer.

Command Station
In 2001 the Proteus line of modules was repackaged in the form of a line of tabletop units, the XL7 and MP7 Command Stations, broadly similar to the rack-mounted 2500 in features but featuring touch-sensitive pads suitable for recording drum patterns.

MK-6/PK-6/Halo

In 2001-2002, E-mu/Ensoniq released a trio of entry-level keyboards, essentially the keyboard versions of the Proteus 2500 module. The E-mu MK-6, XK-6, PK-6 and Ensoniq Halo featured the same 61-key keyboard and controls layout, but slightly different soundset.

Software editor
Prodatum is a cross-platform software editor for the Proteus 1000/2000, Command Stations and keyboard versions. prodatum is free software.

Proteum is a free Windows software editor for Proteus and Command Stations.

OS updates
Since Creative withdrew their provision of historical OS updates and manuals for most of the older E-Mu gear sometime around August 2011, many of these files have been made available elsewhere, such as
Synth Gear Docs Archive and the E-Mu Legacy Archive.

Notable users
Mark Snow used the Whistl'n Joe instrument patch (Patch #125) for The X-Files theme.

Eric Serra used the Infinite One instrument patch to get the sharp, metallic percussive sound that is featured in his soundtracks, such as in The Fifth Element,  Leon the Professional, and  GoldenEye. Subsequently, the video game composer Graeme Norgate would use the same patch in games such as  GoldenEye 007 and Perfect Dark. The sound originally is from a tambourine, pitched down, and treated with delay and reverb effects.

Mike O' Donnell & Junior Campbell for season 3-7 of Thomas & Friends.

References
 

E-mu synthesizers